Stephen Cramer is an American poet.

Life
He teaches at the University of Vermont.

His work appeared in Atlanta Review, Cimarron Review, Green Mountains Review, Hayden's Ferry Review, Mid-American Review, New York Quarterly, and Southwest Review.

He is with the American poets opposed to the death penalty.

Awards
 2008 grant from the Vermont Arts Council.
 2003 National Poetry Series

Works

References

Year of birth missing (living people)
Living people
American male poets